Leptysma is a genus of spur-throat toothpick grasshoppers in the family Acrididae. There are about five described species in Leptysma.

Species
These five species belong to the genus Leptysma:
 Leptysma argentina Bruner, 1906
 Leptysma filiformis (Serville, 1838)
 Leptysma intermedia Bruner, 1911
 Leptysma marginicollis (Serville, 1838) (cattail toothpick grasshopper)
 Leptysma tainan Rehn & Hebard, 1938

References

External links

 

Acrididae